Mallonia albosignata is a species of beetle in the family Cerambycidae. It was described by Chevrolat in 1858. It is known from Mozambique, South Africa, Namibia, Botswana, and Zimbabwe.

References

Pachystolini
Beetles described in 1858
Taxa named by Louis Alexandre Auguste Chevrolat